Panzo is a surname. Notable people with this surname include:

Jonathan Panzo (born 2000), English professional footballer
Barkley Miguel Panzo, French-Angolan professional footballer 
Hermann Panzo, French athlete
Ilídio José Panzo, Angolan footballer

See also
Panza (disambiguation)